The 1933 Columbia Lions football team was an American football team that represented Columbia University as an independent during the 1933 college football season. In their fourth season under head coach Lou Little, the Lions compiled an 8–1 record and outscored opponents  with four shutouts.

The Lions' lone setback was a 20–0 loss to Fritz Crisler's undefeated national champion Princeton Tigers. The Lions concluded the 1933 season on New Year's Day in California with a  victory over Stanford in the mud in the  The school claims a national championship for  This Rose Bowl, held , remains the most recent postseason game for any member of today's Ivy League, which began league play in 1956.

Team captain and quarterback Cliff Montgomery was later inducted into the College Football Hall of Fame.

Schedule

References

Columbia
Columbia Lions football seasons
College football national champions
Rose Bowl champion seasons
Columbia Lions football